Mie Nakao (Japanese: 中尾 ミエ ; born 6 June 1946 in Kokura) is a Japanese actress and singer. With Yukari Ito and Mari Sono she co-starred in the hit 1963 teen movie Hai, Hai Sannin Musume ("Yes, Yes, The Three Girls").  The three actress became the latest incarnation of the long-running series of "Three Girls" acts during the 1950s, 60s and 70s, under their manager Watanabe as the Watanabe-Pro Sannin musume (渡辺プロ三人娘). Nakao has continued to appear on television and produce music.

Filmography

Hissatsu Hitchū Shigotoya Kagyō (1975)
Hissatsu Shiwazanin (1976)
Shin Hissatsu Shiokinin (1977)
A Stitch of Life (2015)
Encanto (2021) – Abuela Alma Madrigal (Japanese voice)

References

External links
 Official website

1946 births
Japanese film actresses
Japanese musical theatre actresses
Japanese television actresses
Japanese women pop singers
Living people
People from Kitakyushu
20th-century Japanese actresses
20th-century Japanese women singers
20th-century Japanese singers
21st-century Japanese actresses
21st-century Japanese women singers
21st-century Japanese singers